The Homberg is a hill of Hesse, Germany.

Hills of Hesse
Natural regions of the Süder Uplands